The Departmental Council of Seine-Saint-Denis (French: Conseil départemental de la Seine-Saint-Denis) is the deliberative assembly of the Seine-Saint-Denis department in France.

It consists of 30 members (general councilors) and its headquarters are 
in Bobigny, capital of the department, and the president is Stéphane Troussel. 
The general councilors are elected for a 6-years term. The Seine-Saint-Denis General Council includes 8 vice-presidents.

The president  
The president of the General Council is currently Stéphane Troussel.

The vice-presidents

The general councilors  
The General Council consists of 30 general councilors (conseillers généraux) who come from the 21 cantons of Seine-Saint-Denis.

Visual identity (logo)

See also  
 Seine-Saint-Denis 
 Departmental council (France)

Website  
 Seine-Saint-Denis General Council 

Seine-Saint-Denis
Departmental councils (France)